In Between is the fifth studio album by Paul van Dyk released on August 14, 2007.  The album features a wide range of collaborations including David Byrne of Talking Heads, Jessica Sutta of the Pussycat Dolls, Ashley Tomberlin of Luminary, Alex M.O.R.P.H., Lo-Fi Sugar, Rea Garvey of Reamonn, Ryan Merchant and Wayne Jackson. The latter had collaborated earlier with Paul van Dyk on the song "The Other Side". The album also features a vocal sample of Ben Lost from Probspot's "Blows My Mind" on the song "Another Sunday".

The first single "White Lies" was released on July 31, 2007 and features vocals from Jessica Sutta of the Pussycat Dolls.  The album is sold as a mixed CD in stores while it is sold unmixed on iTunes and van Dyk's own online store (as the "DJ Friendly Version"), and a bonus track called "Next Generation" was offered exclusively only by pre-order prior to the album's release, via iTunes. It is also sold unmixed on Rhapsody and Napster.  There is also a bonus track that is available from the Vonyc webstore. The track is "Paul van Dyk & Starkillers & Austin Leeds feat. Ashley Tomberlin – New York City (Central Park Remix)".

The album reached No. 115 on The Billboard 200 and No. 2 on the Top Electronic Albums and Top Heatseekers charts. The album also reached number-sixteen on the Mexican Albums Chart and number-five on the International Chart.

"White Lies" and "Let Go" have had videos produced and have been released as singles off the album.

Track listing 
All songs written by Paul van Dyk, except where noted.
 "Haunted" (feat. Lo-Fi Sugar) – 5:40
 "White Lies" (feat. Jessica Sutta) – 4:37
 "Sabotage" – 3:41
 "Complicated" (feat. Ashley Tomberlin) – 7:58
 "Get Back" (Paul van Dyk; Alex M.O.R.P.H.) (feat. Ashley Tomberlin) – 5:23
 "Far Away" (Paul van Dyk; Giuseppe Ottaviani) – 3:32
 "Another Sunday" (feat. a sample of "Blows My Mind" by Probspot) – 6:32
 "Talk in Grey" (feat. Ryan Merchant) – 3:22
 "In Circles" (Paul van Dyk; Alex M.O.R.P.H.) – 4:31
 "In Between" – 3:23
 "Stormy Skies" (feat. Wayne Jackson) – 4:24
 "Détournement" – 2:20
 "New York City" (Paul van Dyk; Starkillers; Austin Leeds) (feat. Ashley Tomberlin) – 5:25
 "Castaway" (feat. Lo-Fi Sugar) – 3:26
 "La Dolce Vita" (Paul van Dyk; Giuseppe Ottaviani) – 2:50
 "Let Go" (feat. Rea Garvey) – 6:17
 "Fall With Me" (feat. David Byrne) – 4:30

Special editions 

Second CD was only available to those who attend the Central Park Event on August 17 & 18, to those who attended the 13th annual Nocturnal Festival on September 29, or from van Dyk's vonyc.com store (download only) as well as on iTunes Store. It also managed to make its way into stores such as FYE.

 "White Lies (Berlin Vocal Mix)" – Mixed By Paul van Dyk & Alex M.O.R.P.H.
 "World in My Eyes" – Vocals By Paul van Dyk

Credits 
 Tracks produced by & mixed by Paul van Dyk including artists mentioned below.
 Strings recorded by Jens Kuphal
 Engineering by Jonas Zadow & Paul van Dyk
 "Haunted" – Producer(s) Alexander Mieling, Paul van Dyk, Vocals By Lo-Fi Sugar
 "White Lies" – Produced & Recorded Vocals By Dave Audé, Vocals By Jessica Sutta, Written By Alexander Rousmaniere, Jennifer Karr & Paul van Dyk
 "Sabotage" – Mixed By Alexander Mieling, Dirk Ever & Paul van Dyk, Producer(s) & Engineer(s) Dirk Ever & Paul van Dyk, Written By Paul van Dyk
 "Complicated" – Vocals By Ashley Tomberlin
 "Get Back" – Producer(s) Alex M.O.R.P.H. & Paul van Dyk, Vocals By Ashley Tomberlin
 "Far Away" – Written By, Produced By & Mixed By: Giuseppe Ottaviani & Paul van Dyk
 "Another Sunday" – Produced & Mixed By Paul van Dyk, Vocals & Lyrics By: Ben Lost
 "Talk in Grey" – Vocals By Ryan Merchant, Written By Alexander Rousmaniere, Paul van Dyk & Ryan Merchant
 "In Circles" – Produced By, Mixed By, Engineering By Alex M.O.R.P.H., Dahnenbach & Jonas Zadow
 "In Between" – Mixed By Alexander Mieling, Dirk Ever, Marco Green & Paul van Dyk, Producer(s) Alexander Mieling & Paul van Dyk
 "Stormy Skies" – Mixed By Marco Green & Paul van Dyk, Producer & Engineer Paul van Dyk, Vocals By Wayne Jackson
 "Détournement" – Produced By & Mixed By Alexander Mieling, Dirk Ever, Marco Green & Paul van Dyk
 "New York City" – Produced By, Mixed By & Engineering By: Austin Leeds, Nick Terranova, Paul van Dyk, Starkillers & Willem Faber, Vocals: Ashley Tomberlin
 "Castaway" – Mixed By Alexander Mieling, Marco Green & Paul van Dyk, Producer Paul van Dyk, Vocals By Lo-Fi Sugar
 "La Dolce Vita" – Engineer(s) Giuseppe Ottaviani & Jonas Zadow, Producer(s) Alexander Mieling, Dahnenbach & Paul van Dyk
 "Let Go" – Produced By & Mixed By Alexander Mieling, Dahnenbach, Paul van Dyk, Vocals and guitar By Rea Garvey
 "Fall With Me" – Vocals By David Byrne
 "Next Generation"

Vitas' Russian version of Let Go 
Russian singer Vitas in 2008 covered his Russian version of the song "Let Go" entitled "Не вернусь" (I Will Not Come Back).

Charts

Weekly charts

Year-end charts

Certifications

References 

2007 albums
Paul van Dyk albums
Avex Group albums
Vandit albums